Hoseynabad-e Sofla (also Romanized as Ḩoseynābād-e Soflá; also known as Ghader Abad, Ḩoseynābād-e Pā’īn, and Qāderābād) is a village in Esmaili Rural District, Esmaili District, Anbarabad County, Kerman Province, Iran. At the 2006 census, its population was 462, in 100 families.

References 

Populated places in Anbarabad County